Assembly elections was held in Maharashtra, India in two phases on September 5, 1999, and September 11, 1999. Election results were declared on October 7, 1999. The major parties were Bharatiya Janata Party - Shiv Sena (Yuti) alliance, Congress and NCP. Congress and NCP contested against each other without a pre-poll alliance but came together for a post-poll alliance to stake claim to form the government.Vilasrao Deshmukh of Congress became Chief Minister, and NCP's Chhagan Bhujbal became Deputy CM.

Lok Sabha elections were held simultaneously, and in them, the BJP-Sena alliance fared better winning 28/48, with Shiv Sena winning 15 seats, BJP 13 seats, Congress 10 seats, and NCP 6 seats.

Results 

List of Political Parties participated in 1999 Maharashtra Assembly Elections.

Summary of results of the Maharashtra State Assembly election, 1999

Region-wise breakup

Alliance-wise

Alliance-wise results

Elected members

References 

State Assembly elections in Maharashtra
1990s in Maharashtra
1999 State Assembly elections in India